Mohammad Atiar Rahman (born January 5, 1974) is a former Bangladeshi cricketer who played for Biman Bangladesh Airlines from 1996 to 2001 as wicket-keeper. He played six first-class matches in his maiden first-class season. He was part of the team in its only 2000/01 domestic season.

References

External links
 

1974 births
Living people
Bangladeshi cricketers
Biman Bangladesh Airlines cricketers
Cricketers from Dhaka
Wicket-keepers